George Cheney Pratt (born May 22, 1928) is a former United States circuit judge of the United States Court of Appeals for the Second Circuit and in 2013 was listed as a NAFTA adjudicator.

Education and career
Pratt was born in Corning, New York. He received a Bachelor of Arts degree from Yale University in 1950. He received a Juris Doctor from Yale Law School in 1953. He was a law clerk for Judge Charles W. Froessel of the New York State Court of Appeals from 1953 to 1955. He was in private practice of law in Nassau County, New York from 1955 to 1976. He was an adjunct professor at St. John's University School of Law from 1978 to 1992. He was a distinguished visiting professor of law at Hofstra University from 1979 to 1993. He was an adjunct professor at Touro Law Center from 1985 to 1993. He was a Professor of Law at Touro Law Center from 1993 to 2003.

Federal judicial service
Pratt was nominated by President Gerald Ford on April 13, 1976, to a seat on the United States District Court for the Eastern District of New York vacated by Judge Anthony J. Travia. He was confirmed by the United States Senate on May 6, 1976, and received commission on May 7, 1976. His service was terminated on June 29, 1982, due to elevation to the Second Circuit.

Pratt was a federal judge on the United States Court of Appeals for the Second Circuit. Pratt was nominated by President Ronald Reagan on April 26, 1982, to a seat on the United States Court of Appeals for the Second Circuit vacated by Judge William H. Timbers. He was confirmed by the Senate on June 18, 1982, and received commission on June 21, 1982. He assumed senior status on May 22, 1993. His service was terminated on January 31, 1995, due to retirement.

Post judicial service
Since 2001, Pratt has engaged in the private practice of law in Uniondale, New York. Since 2013, he has served as a NAFTA adjudicator.

References

External links

Professional biography from the College of Commercial Arbitrators

1928 births
Living people
Hofstra University faculty
Judges of the United States Court of Appeals for the Second Circuit
Judges of the United States District Court for the Eastern District of New York
New York (state) lawyers
People from Corning, New York
People from Central Islip, New York
St. John's University (New York City) faculty
Touro College faculty
United States district court judges appointed by Gerald Ford
United States court of appeals judges appointed by Ronald Reagan
Yale Law School alumni
20th-century American judges